Typhloscaris is a genus of beetles in the family Carabidae, containing the following species:

 Typhloscaris aberdarensis (Alluaud, 1917)
 Typhloscaris alluaudi (Banninger, 1935)
 Typhloscaris andringitrae Basilewsky, 1971
 Typhloscaris carbonaria (Banninger, 1935)
 Typhloscaris descarpentriesi Basilewsky, 1972
 Typhloscaris elgonensis (Banninger, 1935)
 Typhloscaris gracilis Banninger, 1929
 Typhloscaris hutchinsoni (Alluaud, 1917)
 Typhloscaris insularis (Banninger, 1935)
 Typhloscaris jeanneli (Banninger, 1935)
 Typhloscaris kenyensis (Alluaud, 1917)
 Typhloscaris leleupi (Basilewsky, 1960)
 Typhloscaris macrodus Kuntzen, 1914
 Typhloscaris mamboiana (Bates, 1886)
 Typhloscaris marakwetensis (Banninger, 1935)
 Typhloscaris meruensis Etten, 1984
 Typhloscaris microphthalma Banninger, 1929
 Typhloscaris montana (Banninger, 1932)
 Typhloscaris montivaga (Banninger, 1935)
 Typhloscaris uluguruensis (Banninger, 1935)
 Typhloscaris viettei Basilewsky, 1980

References

Scaritinae